Holly King may refer to:

Holly King (actress) (born 1977), American film actress and TV personality
Holly King (artist) (born 1957), Canadian artist and photographer
Holly King (soccer), American professional soccer player
Holly King and Oak King, personifications of seasonal cycles